Shirley Frimpong-Manso (born 16 March 1977) is a Ghanaian film director, writer, and producer. She is the founder and CEO of Sparrow Productions, a film, television and advertising production company. She won Best Director at the 6th Africa Movie Academy Awards. Frimpong-Manso is also a principal of Sparrow Station, a video streaming service for African entertainment from Sparrow and other African film producers. In 2013, she was ranked the 48th most influential person in Ghana according to E.tv Ghana.

Frimpong-Manso is described as one who "seeks to raise the standard of film production in Ghana and Africa by telling progressive African stories as seen through the eyes of Africans." Changing the way Ghana was portrayed also motivated her career choice. Her films are also known for their "fierce female leads," as they portray African women with agency who can be breadwinners and lead complex lives. In December 2019, her movie ‘Potato Potahto’ started streaming on Netflix.

Biography

Frimpong-Manso is from Kwahu Pepease in the Eastern Region of Ghana. As a child she organized plays, which "felt a lot more fun than playing with sand and dolls." She graduated in 2000 from the National Film and Television Institute popularly known as NAFTI in Ghana and worked as a presenter at Radio Gold, a private station in Accra, and then went on to start Sparrow Productions in 2003.

Her husband and business partner is Ken Attoh, and they have a child together.

Works
With producer and actress Juliet Asante, Frimpong-Manso helped produce the TV show Heart to Heart for two years shortly after school. She has also produced:
 Different Shades of Blue - a television series about five university girls who share a dormitory in a university hostel.
 Personalities Kitchen - a cooking programme that hosts two personalities and challenges them to a rice meal of their choice.
 The Miss Ghana Pageant - she produced two semifinalists at the Miss World event within five years during her time.

Filmography

Awards
 6th Africa Movie Academy Awards - Best Director of the Year
 6th Africa Movie Academy Awards - A Sting in a Tale won the Best Soundtrack award
 18th Annual Pan African Film & Arts Festival - A Sting In A Tale took home the award for Audience Favorite-Narrative Feature
 2014 Africa Magic Viewers Choice Awards - Best Movie Director, Best Video Editor, and (jointly with Hertey Owusu) Best Writer (Drama), Contract won Best Movie.
 In March 2021, she was awarded the Film Director of the Year in the Citi TV Entertainment Achievement Awards.

References

External links

 

Ghanaian film directors
Ghanaian women film directors
Ghanaian film producers
Ghanaian women film producers
Ghanaian writers
Ghanaian women writers
Best Director Africa Movie Academy Award winners
Living people
1977 births